David Fox may refer to:
David Fox (game designer) (born 1950), American multimedia producer
David Fox (actor) (1941–2021), Canadian actor
David Fox (footballer) (born 1983), English footballer
David Fox (swimmer) (born 1971), member of the USA 1996 Olympic team
David Spencer Fox (1817–1901), American politician
David G. Fox, U.S. Army officer
Sir David Scott Fox (1910–1985), British diplomat and writer
David R. Fox, candidate in the United States House of Representatives elections in Washington, 2010
David Fox, a pseudonym of Isabel Ostrander